The 2015 Rochester Rhinos season was the club's twentieth season. It was the Rhinos fifth-consecutive year in the third tier of American soccer, playing in the United Soccer League Eastern Conference. The Rhinos finished the regular season in first place, clinching the #1 seed and home field advantage in the 2015 USL Playoffs. The Rhinos won the USL Championship, the club's 5th overall, by defeating LA Galaxy II 2–1 after extra time.

Background 
The Rhinos debuted a new commemorative logo to be used during the 2015 season celebrating the twentieth anniversary of the club's founding.

The Rhinos started the season on a record nineteen game undefeated streak, after finishing the prior season in 6th place.

Competitions

Friendlies

USL

Standings (Eastern Conference)

Results Summary

Results by matchday

USL Playoffs

Playoff Results 

Championship Game MVP: Asani Samuels

U.S. Open Cup

Statistics

Appearances and goals 

|}

Top scorers

Disciplinary record

Roster 
as of April 28, 2015

Technical Staff 
as of May 30, 2015

Transfers

In

Out

Loan in

Loan out

See also 
 2015 in American soccer
 2015 USL season

References 

2015 USL season
Rochester New York FC seasons
American soccer clubs 2015 season
2015 in sports in New York (state)